Supercoven is a two song EP by the doom metal band Electric Wizard. It was originally released on CD and 12" vinyl in 1998 through Bad Acid Records. In 2000 it was re-released on CD through Southern Lord Records with two extra songs.

Track listing
Original track listing:
 "Supercoven" – 13:13
 "Burnout" – 18:37

Extra songs included on the 2000 reissue:
 "Wizards of Gore" – 9:02
 "Electric Wizard (live)" – 9:53

Personnel 
 Jus Oborn - guitar, vocals
 Tim Bagshaw - bass
 Mark Greening - drums
 All Lyrics - Jus Oborn
 All Music - Electric Wizard
 Artwork - Tim Bagshaw

Release history

References

Electric Wizard EPs
1998 EPs
Southern Lord Records EPs